Paul Jeffrey Ross, known by the pseudonym Ross Jeffries, is an American author and pick-up artist.

Neil Strauss, in his 2005 book The Game, describes Jeffries as the "godfather" of the modern pick-up artist community.

Career
In 1988, Jeffries started to study seduction. He taught workshops and promoted a collection of neuro-linguistic programming (NLP) techniques called "speed seduction".

In 1992, he was on a segment of NBC's Faith Daniels Show, appearing with men's rights activist Mel Feit and feminist and ethicist Bruce Weinstein. Jeffries has also been featured on The Dr. Phil Show, The Montel Williams Show, The Jane Whitney Show and The Daily Show, and is a self-described "speed seduction expert". In 2000, Jeffries was featured on Louis Theroux's Weird Weekends.

In 2000, Jeffries sued John White (also known as Don Steele) alleging invasion of privacy, business interference, slander and libel.

In his book The Game, published in 2005, author Neil Strauss describes his experience shadowing Jeffries during Strauss' investigation of the seduction community. He writes that Jeffries acted as the mentor to Mystery and himself. According to the book, Jeffries is Jewish.

Tom Cruise's character in the film Magnolia was inspired by Jeffries according to the film's writer-director Paul Thomas Anderson.

Books

References

External links

Speaking and Sales Website

American relationships and sexuality writers
Jewish American writers
American television personalities
Male television personalities
American male non-fiction writers
Living people
American motivational speakers
American motivational writers
American self-help writers
Life coaches
Popular psychology
Relationship education
Seduction
Pickup artists
21st-century American Jews
Year of birth missing (living people)